Tourism Western Australia is the statutory authority responsible for promoting Western Australia as a tourist destination.

Its earlier predecessors included The Department of Tourism and the Tourism Commission.

See also
 Tourism Australia
 Tourism in Australia

Notes

External links
 Corporate website
 Welcome to Western Australia, tourism website run by Tourism Western Australia

Statutory agencies of Western Australia
Tourism in Western Australia
Tourism organisations in Australia